Ostmark ("Eastern March") was the name used by Nazi propaganda from 1938 to 1942 to replace that of the formerly independent Federal State of Austria after the Anschluss with Nazi Germany. From the Anschluss until 1939, the official name used was Land Österreich ("State of Austria").

History
Once Austrian-born Adolf Hitler completed the union between his birth country and Germany (Anschluss), the Nazi government had the incorporated territory renamed. The name Austria (Österreich in German, meaning "Eastern Realm") was at first replaced by "Ostmark", referring to the 10th century Marcha orientalis. The change was meant to refer to Austria as the new "eastern march" of the Reich.

In August 1938, the Donau-Zeitung proudly referred to Passau as "the cradle of the new Ostmark".

Subdivision
According to the Ostmarkgesetz with effect from 1 May 1939 the former States of Austria were reorganized into seven Reichsgaue, each under the rule of a government official holding the dual offices of Reichsstatthalter (governor) and Gauleiter (Nazi Party leader):
Carinthia, including East Tyrol; increased by Slovenian Carinthia and Upper Carniola as occupied territories after the 1941 Balkans Campaign
"Lower Danube" (Niederdonau), name for Lower Austria, with its capital at Krems an der Donau, including the northern districts of Burgenland with Eisenstadt, the South Moravian territories around Znojmo (Deutsch-Südmähren) annexed with the Sudetenland according to the 1938 Munich Agreement and also the Bratislava boroughs of Petržalka (Engerau) and Devín (Theben)
Salzburg
Styria, including the southern districts of Burgenland; increased by Lower Styria as occupied territory after the 1941 Balkans Campaign
"Upper Danube" (Oberdonau), name for Upper Austria, including the Styrian Aussee region (Ausseerland) and the South Bohemian territories around Český Krumlov annexed with the "Sudetenland" according to the 1938 Munich Agreement
Tyrol, i.e. North Tyrol, with the administrative district of Vorarlberg
Vienna, i.e. "Greater Vienna", including several surrounding Lower Austrian municipalities incorporated in 1938.
A Reichsgau was a new, simple administrative sub-division institution which replaced the federal states in the otherwise completely centralized Third Reich. From April 8, 1942, as the term "Ostmark" was still too reminiscent of the old, independent state of Austria, the chosen official name for the seven entities was Alpen- und Donau-Reichsgaue ("Danubian and Alpine Reichsgaue"). In the course of the Allied occupation after World War II, the Austrian state was restored in its pre-1938 borders according to the 1943 Moscow Declaration.

References

See also
 Areas annexed by Nazi Germany
 Austria under National Socialism

Austria under National Socialism
Austria–Germany relations
Former subdivisions of Germany
States and territories established in 1938
States and territories disestablished in 1945